Ad Lib is an album by American jazz composer and arranger Jimmy Giuffre which was released on the Verve label in 1960.

Reception

Allmusic awarded the album 3 stars.

Track listing 
All compositions by Jimmy Giuffre except as indicated
 "I Got Those Blues" - 9:02
 "I'm Old Fashioned" (Jerome Kern, Johnny Mercer) - 8:36
 "I Hear Red" - 8:18
 "The Boy Next Door" (Ralph Blane, Hugh Martin) - 7:32
 "Stella by Starlight" (Victor Young, Ned Washington) - 8:54
 "Problems" - 8:11

Personnel 
Jimmy Giuffre - clarinet, tenor saxophone, baritone saxophone
Jimmy Rowles - piano
Red Mitchell - bass
Lawrence Marable - drums

References 

Jimmy Giuffre albums
1960 albums
Verve Records albums